

List of airports with a paved runway at least  long

 Notes

  The runway also has a  unpaved overrun on Rogers Dry Lake giving a total length of

Other notable runways

 Notes

  Unpaved runway part of the White Sands Test Facility/White Sands Missile Range
  Unpaved runway located on Rogers Dry Lake and not marked on the Federal Aviation Administration airport diagram.
  Paved runway 14R/32L, closed (length approximate)
  Unpaved runway located on Rosamond Lake and not marked on the Federal Aviation Administration airport diagram.
  Paved runway 14/32, closed (new 4500m runway constructed)

See also
 Aviation
 Density altitude
 List of shortest runways

References

External links 

 

Lists of airports
Technology-related lists
Lists of largest buildings and structures
Lists by length
Longest things